A constitutional referendum was held in Switzerland on 25 October 1914. The proposed amendments of article 103 and the addition of article 114bis were approved by 62.3% of voters and a majority of cantons.

Background
In order to pass, any amendments to the constitution needed a double majority; a majority of the popular vote and majority of the cantons. The decision of each canton was based on the vote in that canton. Full cantons counted as one vote, whilst half cantons counted as half.

Results

References

1914 referendums
1914 in Switzerland
1914
Constitutional referendums in Switzerland